The 1986 Utah State Aggies football team represented Utah State University during the 1986 NCAA Division I-A football season as a member of the Pacific Coast Athletic Association (PCAA). The Aggies were led by first-year head coach Chuck Shelton and played their home games at Romney Stadium in Logan, Utah. They finished the season with a record of three wins and eight losses (3–8, 3–4 PCAA).

Schedule

References

Utah State
Utah State Aggies football seasons
Utah State Aggies football